Jim Vandiver (December 13, 1939June 18, 2015) was a NASCAR Winston Cup Series driver who raced from 1968 to 1983. As an independent driver, he had limited financial resources but enjoyed a level of success that relatively few independent drivers had during the formative years of NASCAR.

Career
Vandiver competed in 85 races with five finishes in the top-five, 24 top-ten finishes, 117 laps led out of 16529, and a total mileage count of 24247.8 miles. Over his career, he had a total of $167,703 in winnings earned on the track ($ when adjusted for inflation).

At the 1972 Daytona 500, Vandiver finished third to winner A. J. Foyt.  Vandiver is also the only undefeated ARCA driver at Talladega Superspeedway with victories in 1970 and 1975.

Most of Vandiver's earlier racers were done in Dodge vehicles. In his later career, he drove Oldsmobile and Chevrolet racecars.

He later operated Choice Trucks, a used truck dealership in Huntersville, North Carolina.

He was involved in the controversial 1969 Talladega 500, where he came in second place to Richard Brickhouse in a questionable finish. Both Vandiver and car owner Ray Fox Sr. were adamant that Brickhouse was a lap down because he had stopped to pit under the green flag (Vandiver only pitted under the Caution). Even after three hours of arguing the decision, Brickhouse was still made the winner of the event. Conspiracy theorists cite the difference in the Dodges as the determining factor since Vandiver was in an older Charger 500 and Brickhouse was in the brand new, winged Dodge Daytona.

Vandiver is known for an unusual exit to the 1973 Southern 500 in Darlington, South Carolina. He was due to be arrested for not showing up to divorce court for a child custody hearing, and had to figure out a way to avoid going to jail. His engine began running worse and worse so he waved goodbye to his pit crew and intentionally spun out his Dodge. To avoid the authorities seizing him on the track in front of the spectators, he ran across the track to escape and hitchhiked a ride to Charlotte, North Carolina in order to get home.

Personal life and death
Vandiver was divorced and had four children; Emory, Rhett, Nicole and Shannon. Emory is a former softball player, Rhett also drives race cars, Nicole and Shannon are practicing lawyers in Davidson, North Carolina.

Vandiver's sister, Lillian, also raced - participating in the 1976 and 1977 Nascar DASH series. 

On June 15, 2015, Vandiver was admitted to a Charlotte hospital for chest pains. He died three days later at the age of 75.

References

External links
 

1939 births
2015 deaths
NASCAR drivers
ARCA Menards Series drivers
People from Huntersville, North Carolina
Racing drivers from Charlotte, North Carolina
Racing drivers from North Carolina